Akuapim may refer to:

Akuapim North District, a district of the Eastern Region of Ghana
Akuapim South District, a district of the Eastern Region of Ghana